ASSL, assl, or variant, may refer to:

Companies and divisions
 Ananda Shipyard and Shipways Limited (ASSL)
 Antonin Scalia School of Law

Computing
 Agglomerated SSL (assl), a fork of Open SSL, see OpenSSL#assl
 Autonomic System Specification Language, see Autonomic computing

Other
 Annual Status of Student Learning, a study in India carried out by Educational Initiatives